Standing on the Edge of the Noise  is a look at Oasis performing in their own space, instead of the huge stadium stages on which they are more often seen. It is also the name of a track on Oasis's successor band Beady Eye's debut album.

An edit for TV was shown on 4Music on 23 November 2008, and on Channel 4 on 29 November 2008.

"Standing on the Edge of the Noise" was also a song written by Gem Archer, released when Beady Eye included it on their debut album, 2011's Different Gear, Still Speeding.

Track list
(TV edit)
 "Rock 'n' Roll Star" Intro
 "The Shock of the Lightning"
 "To Be Where There's Life"
 "Waiting for the Rapture"
 "The Masterplan"
 "Songbird"
 "Slide Away"
 "Ain't Got Nothin'"
 "The Importance of Being Idle"
 "I'm Outta Time"
 "Supersonic"
 "Don't Look Back in Anger"
 "Falling Down"

(complete show)
 "Rock 'n' Roll Star"
 "Lyla"
 "The Shock of the Lightning"
 "Cigarettes & Alcohol"
 "The Meaning of Soul"
 "To Be Where There's Life"
 "Waiting for the Rapture"
 "The Masterplan"
 "Songbird"
 "Slide Away"
 "Morning Glory"
 "Ain't Got Nothin'"
 "The Importance of Being Idle"
 "I'm Outta Time"
 "Wonderwall"
 "My Big Mouth"
 "Supersonic"
 "Don't Look Back in Anger" (acoustic)
 "Falling Down"
 "Champagne Supernova"
 "I Am the Walrus"

Notes
As of August 2009, there is no official release; however there are various bootlegs of both the TV edit and the complete concert available in various video and audio formats.

Personnel
Oasis
Liam Gallagher – vocals
Noel Gallagher – vocals, electric guitar
Gem Archer – electric guitar
Andy Bell – bass, keyboard
Chris Sharrock - drums
Jay Darlington - keyboard

References

Oasis (band) video albums
2000s English-language films